Mariano Beltranena y Llano was a Liberal Guatemalan politician who served as interim president of the Federal Republic of Central America from 13 April 1829 to 14 June 1829. He also served as vice president prior to being interim president after José Cecilio del Valle resigned as Manuel José Arce's vice president.

See also 
 List of presidents of Guatemala
 José Francisco Barrundia

References 

19th-century Guatemalan people
Year of birth missing
Year of death missing